The Sackler family is an American family who founded and owned the pharmaceutical companies Purdue Pharma and Mundipharma. Purdue Pharma, and some members of the family, have faced lawsuits regarding overprescription of addictive pharmaceutical drugs, including OxyContin. Purdue Pharma has been criticized for its role in the opioid epidemic in the United States. They have been described as the "most evil family in America", and "the worst drug dealers in history".

The Sackler family has been profiled in various media, including the documentary Crime of the Century on HBO, the book Empire of Pain by Patrick Radden Keefe, the 2021 Hulu miniseries Dopesick, and the 2022 Oscar-nominated documentary All the Beauty and the Bloodshed.

History
Arthur, Mortimer, and Raymond Sackler, the three children of Jewish immigrants from Galicia and Poland, grew up in Brooklyn in the 1930s. All three of the siblings went to medical school and worked together at the Creedmoor Psychiatric Center in Queens. They were often cited as early pioneers in medication techniques which ended the common practice of lobotomies, and were also regarded as the first to fight for the racial integration of blood banks. Arthur Sackler was widely regarded as the patriarch of the family. In 1952, the brothers bought a small pharmaceutical company, Purdue-Frederick.
Raymond and Mortimer ran Purdue, while Arthur, the oldest brother, became a pioneer in medical advertising. He devised campaigns appealing directly to doctors, and enlisted prominent physicians to endorse Purdue's products.
As one of the foremost art collectors of his generation, he also donated the majority of his collections to museums around the world. After his death in 1987, his option on one third of Purdue-Frederick was sold by his estate to his two brothers who turned it into Purdue Pharma.

In 1996, Purdue Pharma introduced OxyContin, a reformulated version of oxycodone in a slow-release form. Oxycodone was first invented in 1916 and sold as Eukodal, but had been withdrawn from the market in 1990 due to addiction issues.

Heavily promoted, oxycodone is a key drug in the emergence of the opioid epidemic. Elizabeth Sackler, daughter of Arthur Sackler, claimed that her branch of the family did not participate in or benefit from the sales of narcotics.  While some have criticized Arthur Sackler for pioneering marketing techniques to promote non-opioids decades earlier, Professor Evan Gerstmann said in Forbes magazine, "It is an absurd inversion of logic to say that because Arthur Sackler pioneered direct marketing to physicians, he is responsible for the fraudulent misuse of that technique, which occurred many years after his death and from which he procured no financial gain." In 2018, multiple members of the Raymond and Mortimer Sackler families, Richard Sackler, Theresa Sackler, Kathe Sackler, Jonathan Sackler, Mortimer Sackler, Beverly Sackler, David Sackler, and Ilene Sackler, were all named as defendants in suits filed by numerous states over their involvement in the opioid crisis.

In 2012, a member of the Sackler family bought Stargroves, a manor house near Newbury in the UK for more than its £15 million listing price; former owners at different times of the estate have been Mick Jagger and Rod Stewart.
The family was first listed in Forbes list of America's Richest Families in 2015. 

The Sackler family is also the owner of Mundipharma, a lower profile pharma company that has significant operations in China. Bloomberg News reported in 2020 that the family had hired an investment bank to identify a potential buyer of the business. The company could fetch as much as $3 to $5 billion.

Genealogy

 Isaac Sackler and Sophie Greenberg
Arthur M. Sackler, (1913–1987), married Else Finnich Jorgensen 1934 and divorced, married Marietta Lutze 1949 and divorced, and Jillian Lesley Tully 1981 until death
 Carol Master (b. 1941)
 Elizabeth Sackler (b. 1948)
 Michael Sackler-Berner
 Arthur Felix Sackler (b. 1950)
 Denise Marika (b. 1955)
 Mortimer Sackler (1916–2010) obtained British citizenship and renounced American citizenship. Married Theresa Elizabeth Rowling (born 1949) in 1980 until his death, married Gertraud (Gheri) Wimmer in 1969 and divorced, married Muriel Lazarus (1917–2009) and divorced. 
Ilene Sackler Lefcourt (b. 1946) (married Gerald B. Lefcourt and divorced)
Kathe Sackler (b. 1948) (spouse Susan Shack Sackler)
Robert Mortimer Sackler (1951-1975)
Mortimer A. Sackler (b. 1971) (married Jaqueline Sackler)
Samantha Sophia Sackler Hunt (b. 1968)
Marissa Sackler
Sophie Sackler (married Jamie Dalrymple)
Michael Sackler
Raymond Sackler (1920–2017), married Beverly Feldman in 1944 until death Beverly died in October 2019, aged 95
 Richard Sackler, born 1945, married Beth Sackler and divorced.
 David Sackler (married Joss Ruggles)
 Marianna Sackler (married James Frame)
 Jonathan Sackler (1955–2020)
 Clare Sackler
 Madeleine Sackler, Emmy Award-winning filmmaker
 Miles Sackler

Donations to promote Sackler name

The Sackler family has donated to cultural institutions, including the Metropolitan Museum of Art, the American Museum of Natural History, and the Guggenheim.

The family has also donated to universities, including Harvard University, Yale University, Cornell University, and the University of Oxford. The Sackler Faculty of Medicine at Tel Aviv University is named after Arthur, Mortimer, and Raymond Sackler for their donations. Similarly, the Sackler Institute of Pulmonary Pharmacology at King's College London was named after Mortimer and Theresa Sackler.

The Sackler family has previously donated to the China International Culture Exchange Center (CICEC), a front organization of China's Ministry of State Security.

The Sackler family contributed about $116,000 to the Connecticut Democratic Party.

Reputation laundering

The Sackler family name, as used in institutions which the family have donated to, saw increased scrutiny in the late 2010s over the family's association with OxyContin. David Crow, writing in the Financial Times, described the family name as "tainted" (cf. Tainted donors). In March 2019, the National Portrait Gallery and the Tate galleries announced that they would not accept further donations from the family. This came after the American photographer Nan Goldin threatened to withdraw a planned retrospective of her work in the National Portrait Gallery if the gallery accepted a £1 million donation from a Sackler fund. In June 2019, NYU Langone Medical Center announced they will no longer be accepting donations from the Sacklers, and have since changed the name of the Sackler Institute of Graduate Biomedical Sciences to the Vilcek Institute of Graduate Biomedical Sciences. Later in 2019, the American Museum of Natural History, and the Solomon R. Guggenheim Museum and Metropolitan Museum of Art in New York, each announced they will not accept future donations from any Sacklers that were involved in Purdue Pharma.

On July 1, 2019, Nan Goldin, an American photographer and the founder of P.A.I.N., led a small groups of protesters who unfurled a banner "Take down the Sackler name" against the backdrop of the Louvre's glass pyramid.
According to The New York Times, the Louvre in Paris was the first major museum to "erase its public association" with the Sackler family name. On July 16, 2019, the museum had removed the plaque at the gallery entrance about Sacklers’ donations made to the museum. Throughout the gallery, grey tape covered signs such as Sackler Wing, including signage for the Louvre's Persian and Levantine artifacts collection, which was removed on July 8 or 9. Signage for the collection had identified it as the Sackler Wing of Oriental Antiquities since 1997.

The Metropolitan Museum of Art announced it would remove the Sackler name from galleries and other locations within the museum in December 2021.

The family's philanthropy has been characterized as reputation laundering from profits acquired from the selling of opiates. In 2022, the British Museum announced that it would rename the Raymond and Beverly Sackler Rooms and the Raymond and Beverly Sackler Wing, as part of "development of the new masterplan", and that it "made this decision together through collaborative discussions" with the Sackler Foundation.

Opioid lawsuits
In 2019, a suit was brought in the Southern District of New York, which included more than 500 counties, cities and Native American tribes. It named eight family members: Richard, Jonathan, Mortimer, Kathe, David, Beverly and Theresa Sackler as well as Ilene Sackler Lefcourt. In addition, Massachusetts, Connecticut, Rhode Island and Utah all brought suits against the family. On the federal level, the family faced an overall bundle of 1,600 cases.

According to the New Yorker, Purdue Pharma played a "special role" in the opioid crisis because the company "was the first to set out, in the nineteen-nineties, to persuade the American medical establishment that strong opioids should be much more widely prescribed—and that physicians’ longstanding fears about the addictive nature of such drugs were overblown."

In late 2020, the Committee on Oversight and Reform of the US House of Representatives held a hearing on the role of Purdue Pharma and the Sackler family in the opioid epidemic. "We don't agree on a lot on this committee, in a bipartisan way," the ranking member, James Comer of Kentucky said, "but I think our opinion of Purdue Pharma and the actions of your family...are sickening." The Sacklers were also accused of being "addicted to money." Of the Sacklers responses in the hearing, author Patrick Radden Keefe stated "They could produce a rehearsed simulacrum of human empathy" but were "impervious to any genuine moral epiphany." Jim Cooper, a congressman from Tennessee, stated to David Sackler: "Watching you testify makes my blood boil. I am not sure I am aware of any family in America that's more evil than yours." Of the Sacklers' wealth and Richard Sackler's in particular, Keefe states: "No one wanted his money."

In March 2021, Purdue Pharma filed a restructuring plan to dissolve itself and establish a new company dedicated to programs designed to combat the opioid crisis. The proposal was for the Sackler family to pay an additional US$4.2 billion over the next nine years to resolve various civil claims in exchange for immunity from criminal prosecutions. This "legal firewall" was opposed by 24 state attorneys general as well as the attorney general for Washington, D.C. "If the Sacklers are allowed to use bankruptcy to escape the consequences of their actions," said the state AGs who called the proposal legally unprecedented, "it would be a roadmap for other powerful bad actors."

In a bankruptcy court filing on July 7, 2021, multiple states agreed to settle. Though Purdue admitted no wrongdoings, the Sacklers would agree never to produce opioids again and pay billions in damages toward a charitable fund. Purdue Pharma was dissolved on September 1, 2021. The Sacklers agreed to pay $4.5 billion over nine years, with most of that money funding addiction treatment. The bankruptcy judge acknowledged that the Sacklers had moved money to offshore accounts to protect it from claims, and he said he wished the settlement had been higher.

However, on December 16, 2021, U.S District Judge Colleen McMahon ruled that the bankruptcy judge did not have authority to give the Sacklers immunity in civil liability cases.

References

Further reading

External links
 John Oliver's segment on the Sackler family in August 2021 archived in Ghostarchive.org on 24 April, 2022

 
Drugs in the United States
Opioids in the United States
Opioid epidemic
American billionaires
British billionaires
Business families of the United States
Jewish-American families
American people of Ukrainian-Jewish descent
Wealth in the United States
Organized crime in the United States